Chabelley, is a village in the southern Arta region of Djibouti. It lies less than 13 km from the capital Djibouti City.

Demographics
As of 2019, Chabelley has a population of around 1,011 inhabitants. Most residents belong to various mainly Afro-Asiatic-speaking ethnic groups, with the Issa Somali predominant.

Transportation
The Ethio-Djibouti Railways passes through the village. Nearby towns and villages include Ali Sabieh (65 km), Goubetto (15 km), Ali Adde (55 km) and Holhol (29 km).

Some 1.5 miles north of Chabelley is Chabelley Airport, a desert airstrip until recently exclusively reserved in case of need for French military devices. In September 2013, the airstrip began serving as a temporary hub for U.S. military unmanned aircraft from the nearby Camp Lemonnier Naval Expeditionary Base.

Climate

See also
Railway stations in Djibouti

Notes

References
Chébelé, Djibouti

External links
Satellite view of Chabelley

Populated places in Djibouti
Arta Region